Emilio Alonso Larrazabal often known as Emilín, (25 May 1912 – 29 December 1989) was a Basque footballer from the north of Spain who played as a forward.

Career
Alonso began his career at Arenas Club de Getxo in 1929. At the age of 21 he was known as one of the best forwards in Spanish football. He joined Real Madrid in 1933, which at that time was called the Madrid Foot-ball Club, and had the luck to play with other great players like Zamora, Ciriaco, Quincoces, Luis Regueiro, Pedro Regueiro, Lazcano, Lecue, Sañudo, Leoncito and Esparza, who together formed one of the best teams ever in Real Madrid's history. With this team Emilin won the La Liga twice. He played for Real Madrid for three years between 1933 and 1936, scoring 16 goals in 42 official matches.

He was selected to play for the Spain national team on two occasions in 1936. His first match for Spain took place in Madrid, against Austria, and his second against Germany, in Barcelona.

In 1937 La Liga was suspended due to the Spanish Civil War. In its place Alonso was chosen to be part of the Basque Country national team for its tour of Europe. Later, in the 1938–39 season, he played for CD Euzkadi in Mexico, before moving to San Lorenzo de Almagro in Argentina for the 1939–40 season. In 1940 he returned to Mexico to join Club España. Later he became the team's technical director.

Personal life
Alonso was born in Las Arenas, Biscay, in the Basque Country in northern Spain.

He married Carmela González in Mexico and had three children, Emilio, Mayo and Ricardo. After retiring from football he became the owner of a printing company in Mexico City.

His brother Santos Alonso Larrazabal was also a professional footballer.

Honours
Real Madrid
 Two Copa del Rey
 Six Campeonato Mancomunados

References

External links 
Emilin's biography at Real Madrid official website (Spanish)
Emilio Alonso Larrazábal's profile at BDFutbol

1912 births
1989 deaths
Spanish footballers
Footballers from Getxo
Arenas Club de Getxo footballers
Real Madrid CF players
Exiles of the Spanish Civil War in Mexico
Spanish emigrants to Mexico
Naturalized citizens of Mexico
La Liga players
San Lorenzo de Almagro footballers
Real Club España footballers
Spain international footballers
Argentine Primera División players
Association football forwards
Spanish expatriate sportspeople in Mexico
Spanish expatriate sportspeople in Argentina
Liga MX players
Spanish expatriate footballers
Expatriate footballers in Mexico
Expatriate footballers in Argentina
Basque Country international footballers